Hilde Østbø (born 1 September 1974) is a Norwegian handball player who played for the club Sola IL and the Norwegian national team in the 1990s. She was born in Stavanger. She competed at the 1996 Summer Olympics in Atlanta, where the Norwegian team finished fourth.

References

External links

Norwegian female handball players
Handball players at the 1996 Summer Olympics
Olympic handball players of Norway
Sportspeople from Stavanger
1974 births
Living people